Loomis & the Lust are an independent California pop rock band based out of Santa Barbara that formed in 2008. They gained recognition in 2009 with the release of their first EP Nagasha and their single "Bright Red Chords" which was featured on MTV Iggy and MTVU. Loomis and the Lust was named one of the Top 25 Best New Bands in the World by MTV Iggy in 2010.. The band's YouTube channel has over one million views and their single "Bright Red Chords" received nationwide airplay and 40,000 copies were distributed worldwide through an Urban Outfitters sampler CD. The song was also played in clothing stores such as Hollister, Footlocker, Abercrombie and Fitch, as well as Delta Airlines and during movie trivia in Lowes theaters.

The band was formed by frontman (and namesake) Will Loomis in 2007. The band recorded their first EP in Nagasha in 2009 followed by a second EP Space Camp in 2010. After the band's initial success in 2010, guitarist Casey Hooper joined Katy Perry's band and bass player Scott Henson joined the cast of Glee. Loomis believed that Jessie J's #1 hit single "Domino" had similarities to "Bright Red Chords" which he attributed to Hooper intermingling with Katy Perry's songwriting/producing team of Dr. Luke and Max Martin. Loomis subsequently filed a copyright infringement lawsuit against Universal Music Group which he lost, with Judge Richard Clifton ruling "Nothing in the record shows the requisite nexus between Hooper and the 'Domino' songwriters except for Loomis’ own speculation."

On June 27, 2012 Will Loomis sued Jessie J and her record label Universal Music Group in a widely publicized case of copyright infringement alleging that the melody in "Domino" (2011) was identical to the melody in "Bright Red Chords" (2008). Loomis made a mashup of the two songs which Universal attempted to take off YouTube prompting Wikinews to cover the story. Loomis posted a letter from Jessie J's record label dated May 5, 2010 in which they expressed interest in the song and asked him to send them a copy.  Will Loomis gave an interview about the lawsuit with the Who Stole What Podcast in July 2014.  Loomis has been an outspoken critic of Dr. Luke's track record of copyright infringements posting several mashups on youtube, the most notorious being The Rubinoos v.s. Avril Lavigne which reportedly settled out of court.

After his initial success in Loomis and the Lust Will Loomis launched a solo career writing and performing live as well as producing other artists in the studio. In addition to national tours Loomis has had success placing songs in TV and film notably his song "Good Time Lover" in NCIS LA and "Bright Red Chords" in Movie 43. While Loomis has worked in the studio with some major label acts like Depeche Mode in 2013, he prefers to produce up and coming independent artists.

Loomis and the Lust's 2010 EP Space Camp contained the single "A.D.D." which went viral on YouTube gaining or 500,000 hits , and "Good Time Lover" which was featured in an episode of NCIS L.A. Their song "Bright Red Chords" was featured in an episode of Blue Mountain State as well as the feature film Movie 43. Loomis and the Lust won the $25,000 prize at the "Artist on the Verge" contest gaining them a feature in Billboard Magazine. put on by OurStage.com and the New Music Seminar.

Loomis & the Lust's song "Bright Red Chords" won MTVu's “Freshman” music video award  and the band wrote a tour blog for MTV Iggy on MTV Iggy containing humorous tales and video clips of life on the road. MTV traveled to Santa Barbara for an exclusive interview and performance by Loomis and the Lust in 2009. In 2010 the band worked with live music producer Tom Jackson, and Prince guitar player Dez Dickerson as part of their Artist on the Verge award and filmed a live blog of the experience for MTV Iggy.

In 2011 Will Loomis recorded a live full length country album called "Old Country Part 1", and toured the country with an acoustic guitar. The album features stripped-down acoustic songs.

In 2015 Will Loomis embarked on a full length rock album, working with bassist Reggie Hamilton (Warren Zevon), keyboardist Dave Palmer (Joe Cocker, Rod Stewart), guitarist Kirk Hellie (Ringside) and drummer Norm Block (Plexi). The album is currently being shopped to major labels.

E-magazine Blurt Online said the following of the band, "Loomis & the Lust, as the quartet in question is known, is a smart, lean and energetic band of twenty-somethings who look backwards through the lens of classic pop and rock while retaining a contemporary sound that steers blessedly clear of the dull guitar murk that passes for rock in the post-grunge era and vaults well past the sound-alike mediocrity of indie-rock's ever-expanding purgatory."

Discography

The band released its debut EP in 2009, entitled Nagasha. Their second EP, Space Camp, was released on August 10, 2010. In April 2012 Loomis and the Lust reformed and released a 3rd EP "Sports Suck", along with videos for their singles "My Fix" and "Sports Suck". On March 30, 2013 Will Loomis released an album of songs titled "The Nobody" http://loomisandthelust.bandcamp.com/ in reference to Jessie J's fans accusing him of being "a Nobody".

References

http://forums.digitalspy.co.uk/showthread.php?t=1683319

Rock music groups from California